This is a timeline of geopolitical changes around the world between 1500 and 1899. It includes dates of declarations of independence, changes in country name, changes of capital city or name, and changes in territorial ownership such as the annexation, occupation, cession, concession, or secession of land. Territorial conquests as a result of war are included on the timeline at the conclusion of major military campaigns, but changes in the course of specific battles and day-to-day operations are generally not included.

16th century

17th century

18th century
1700s

1710s

1720s

1730s

1740s

1750s

1760s

1770s

1780s

1790s

19th century
1800s

1810s

1820s

1830s

1840s

1850s

1860s

1870s

1880s

1890s

Maps

See also

Notes

References

Geography-related lists
Geopolitics
History-related lists
Maps